The Secretariat of the Naifaru Council, is the legislative body elected under the law of local government, in Maldives. there are seven elected members in the council.

Committees
Evaluation Committee
Women's Development Committee
Committee of Land ownership

Administrative Units
Cooperate Affairs Unit
Municipal Service Unit
Economic Development and Social Service Unit

Subdivisions of the Maldives